Pablo Muñiz Larrosa (born 16 August 1977 in Montevideo) is a Uruguayan footballer who plays as a defender. He currently plays for Atenas de San Carlos.

Muñiz's career began when he signed a professional contract with Defensor Sporting in 1996, making his first-team debut in 1997 aged 20.

Teams
  Defensor Sporting 1997-1999
  Sud América 2000-2005
  Rentistas 2006-2007
  Progreso 2007-2009
  Atenas 2009–present

External links
 
 Pablo Muñiz at playmakerstats.com (English version of ceroacero.es)

1977 births
Living people
Uruguayan footballers
Defensor Sporting players
Sud América players
C.A. Rentistas players
C.A. Progreso players
Atenas de San Carlos players
Association football defenders